Félicien Ntambue Kasembe, CICM (born 8 September 1970) is a Congolese priest of the Catholic Church and a member of the Congregation of the Immaculate Heart of Mary.  He is the bishop-elect of the Diocese of Kabinda, having been appointed to the position in 2020.  Before he became a priest, he did missionary work in Taiwan, Hong Kong, Singapore and Mongolia.

Early life
Ntambue Kasembe was born in Kabinda, in the province of Lomami, on 8 September 1970. He graduated with a state diploma in 1988, studying biology and chemistry. He became a novice of the Congregation of the Immaculate Heart of Mary (the Scheut Missionaries) in the Mbudi neighborhood of Kinshasa in 1989 and studied philosophy at the Seminary of St. Peter Canisius for three years beginning in 1990. Between 1993 and 1996, he undertook an internship as a missionary in Taiwan, Hong Kong, Singapore and Mongolia. He then made his final vows as a Scheut Missionary. He studied theology in the Philippines and Cameroon from 1996 until 2001. On 12 August 2001, Ntambue was ordained a priest in Kabinda.

Presbyteral ministry
After ordination, Ntambue's first pastoral assignment was as vicar of St. Eugène church in Menkao, Kinshasa, where he served for two years and became pastor. He then worked for his order as Provincial Secretary and Rector of Scheutists in Kinshasa from 2003 to 2006 and then as Director of the Pedagogical Research Center in Kinshasa and Secretary of the Scheutists' Provincial Commission for Finance from 2003 to 2007. He then returned to academic pursuits and earned a bachelor's degree in civil law from the Notre Dame de la Paix University in Namur in 2009, a master's in civil law from the Catholic University of Louvain-la-Neuve and master's in human rights at the Saint Louis Faculty of Law in Brussels in 2011. Returning to Kinshasa, he was Provincial Councilor of the CICM in Kinshasa from 2013 to 2016. The next year he was the African Delegate on the committee preparing for the CICM General Chapter and then the delegate of the Kinshasa Province to that meeting 2017.

Ntambue has been one of the General Councillors of the CICM Missionaries since June 2017.

Episcopal ministry
Ntambue was appointed Bishop of Kabinda on 23 July 2020.

References

External links

1970 births
20th-century Roman Catholic priests

21st-century Roman Catholic priests
Living people
People from Lomami Province